The Piano Sonata No. 18 in E major, Op. 31, No. 3, is an 1802 sonata for solo piano by Ludwig van Beethoven. A third party gave the piece the nickname "The Hunt" due to one of its themes' resemblance to a horn call. Beethoven maintains a playful jocularity throughout much of the piece, but as in many of his early works, the jocular style can be heard as a facade, concealing profound ideas and depths of emotion.

Roger Kamien has performed a Schenkerian analysis of facets of chords of the sonata.

Analysis 
The sonata consists of four movements:

The sonata is unusual in lacking a slow movement.

I. Allegro 

Beethoven's progressive harmonic language is apparent from the very first chord of the piece (third inversion of the eleventh on dominant B); the stability of a tonic chord in root position is delayed until bar 8. The expressive harmonic colour coupled with the changes of tempi in the introduction (mm. 1–18) create an evocative opening, reminiscent of the improvisatory style of C. P. E. Bach's piano sonatas. This opening cell is repeated extensively throughout the movement – at the start of the development (m. 89), in the recapitulation (m. 137), and during the coda (transposed into the subdominant A (m. 220), and then at its original pitch (m. 237)). The modulatory passage between the first and second subjects (mm. 33–45) explores the opening chord, but in a minor variation (with a C, implying ii7 of E minor), even appearing in bar 36 in the exact spacing (albeit with different spelling) of the Tristan chord written by Richard Wagner some 55 years later.

II. Scherzo 

This wasn't the first time Beethoven wrote a scherzo not in ternary form; Op. 14, No. 2 has a scherzo in rondo form as its finale. But this movement still contains many characteristics of a scherzo, including unexpected pauses and a playful nature. The theme is in the right hand while the left hand contains staccato accompaniment.

III. Menuetto 

The third movement is the most serious of the movements, with a sweet and tender nature. The minuet and the trio are in E major.

IV. Presto con fuoco 

The finale is vigorous and rollicking, with continuous eighth notes in the bass and tarantella rhythms.

Adaptations
Camille Saint-Saëns used the Trio section of the Menuetto as the theme for his 1874 Variations sur un thème de Beethoven, Op. 35, for two pianos.

References

External links 
A lecture by András Schiff on Beethoven's piano sonata Op. 31, No. 3
 For a public domain recording of this sonata visit Musopen
 
Recording by Paavali Jumppanen, piano from the Isabella Stewart Gardner Museum

Piano Sonata 18
1802 compositions
Compositions in E-flat major